Loulou may refer to:

People
Enver Hoxha, Communist leader of Albania from 1944 until his death in 1985
Louise Lévêque de Vilmorin
Loulou de la Falaise, French fashion muse and designer.

Other uses
Loulou (film), a 1980 French film directed by Maurice Pialat
LOU LOU, a Canadian women's magazine
Loulou, a 1989 children's picture book by Grégoire Solotareff

See also
 Lulu (disambiguation)